Chris Koberstein (born 28 May 1968) is a Canadian former cyclist. He competed at the 1988 Summer Olympics and the 1992 Summer Olympics. He won a silver medal at the 1990 Commonwealth Games competing for Canada in the team time trial.

References

External links
 

1968 births
Living people
Canadian male cyclists
Olympic cyclists of Canada
Cyclists at the 1988 Summer Olympics
Cyclists at the 1992 Summer Olympics
Cyclists from Montreal
Commonwealth Games medallists in cycling
Commonwealth Games silver medallists for Canada
Cyclists at the 1990 Commonwealth Games
20th-century Canadian people
Medallists at the 1990 Commonwealth Games